The 1981 Nebraska Cornhuskers football team represented the University of Nebraska–Lincoln in the 1981 NCAA Division I-A football season. The team was coached by Tom Osborne and played their home games in Memorial Stadium in Lincoln, Nebraska.

Schedule

Roster

Depth chart

Coaching staff

Game summaries

Iowa

Unranked Iowa jumped out to 10-0 lead by halftime on their way to paying back the 0-57 defeat handed to them by the Cornhuskers last year, and Nebraska was unable to answer in kind.  Three 4th quarter Nebraska forays into Hawkeye territory produced no points, and an Iowa interception with 39 seconds remaining closed the book on the upset.  Iowa went on to play in the Rose Bowl.

Florida State

Nebraska held a close 10-7 lead at halftime, but the momentum quickly turned in favor of the Cornhuskers when WB Irving Fryar scored on an 82-yard punt return, followed up six game clock seconds later when DE Tony Felici's off-the-bench opportunity allowed him to recover a Florida State fumble on the kickoff and return it 13 yards for another touchdown.  Nebraska sealed the deal on a 94-yard touchdown run by IB Roger Craig, tying the standing Nebraska record.  Felici's defensive performance earned him the starting position.

Penn State

No major records fell on this day, as each team fought to overcome the other and the scoring lead was exchanged five times.  Penn State running back and future NFL star Curt Warner rolled up 238 yards, nearly matching the entire Nebraska team ground production.  Penn State pulled ahead on an early 4th-quarter touchdown and added a field goal with 4:54 remaining to extend their lead to 6 points, and the Cornhuskers were unable to muster a response before time expired.  Nebraska fell out of the rankings for the first time since a one-week absence early in the 1977 season.

Auburn

Auburn put up a 1st-quarter field goal to take the lead, and the score remained 3-0 at halftime.  Through the course of the game, however, Auburn coughed up 10 fumbles, losing half of them, and never scored again.  Nebraska quarterback Turner Gill took over after halftime, and with help from the turnovers, Nebraska overcome the weight of their worst season start since 1960 and put up 17 points in the second half to even up their season record at 2-2.

Colorado

This game marked the first start for Nebraska QB Turner Gill and IB Mike Rozier, and the Cornhuskers finally came to life.  Gill tied an existing Nebraska record by passing for four touchdowns, as Nebraska piled up 719 offensive yards and set a new NCAA record with 42 first downs while racking up all 59 points before the start of the 4th quarter, while the Blackshirts posted their first shutout of the season.

Kansas State

Entering the game, the Huskers were ranked #19 in the AP poll, beginning an NCAA-record streak of 348 consecutive appearances in the AP rankings. For the third straight game, the Nebraska defense prevented a touchdown, as the Cornhuskers rolled up 674 offensive yards and handled Kansas State with ease, showing that the return of Nebraska to the rankings at #19 was appropriate.  Despite recovering three of eight Nebraska fumbles and the opportunity to capitalize accordingly, the Wildcats still managed only 8 first downs, and they barely avoided the shutout with a single 3rd-quarter field goal.

Missouri

This slugfest of two nearly evenly ranked teams contained plenty of action if not points, as the stalemate dragged on until time nearly ran out.  Finally, with just 23 seconds left in the 4th quarter, Nebraska FB Phil Bates punched a three-yard run into the end zone.  Like all the other scoring attempts preceding the eventual touchdown, even the PAT failed, and Nebraska departed Columbia with the 6–0 win.

Kansas

The Blackshirts extended their touchdown-prevention streak to five games, yet Nebraska was still behind 9-3 at halftime due to the prolific field goal production from Kansas PK Bruce Kallmeyer.  Adjustments made during the break had an immediate effect, however, and despite Kallmeyer putting two more kicks between the uprights, the Cornhusker offense ran off four touchdowns with the help of IB Mike Rozier's career-best 179 yards to pull away.

Oklahoma State

The high-flying Oklahoma State defense, ranked #1 in the nation when the Cornhuskers rolled into town, were obliterated by Nebraska's 546 yards of offense.  Nebraska QB Turner Gill led his squad to scores on their first three possessions, and handed over the controls shortly after halftime, but the Cornhuskers continued to score with ease.  The Nebraska defense allowed just one score, a 3rd-quarter touchdown, which ended their touchdown-free streak at 22 quarters.

Iowa State

The Cornhuskers struggled to put Iowa State behind them, catching up with them to enter halftime tied at 7, and it wasn't until the 4th quarter that the worn-down Cyclones allowed a 63-yard punt return touchdown by WB Irving Fryar as they gave up 24 unanswered points to decide the outcome.  However, Nebraska QB Turner Gill suffered a leg injury that eventually became serious enough to cause nerve damage, putting him out for the rest of the season and also casting a shadow over his athletic future.

Oklahoma

Oklahoma started out strong but failed to produce points to match their ability to march down the field, hampered by losing 3 of 5 fumbles over the course of the game.  Despite the early concern, the Sooners went to the locker room at the half trailing 24-7 after a successful campaign by backup Nebraska QB Mark Mauer, and Oklahoma was never able to recover.  Nebraska finished with an unbeaten conference slate and headed to Miami as conference champions.

Clemson

Nebraska failed to capitalize on the opportunity for a national championship, coming in as #4 to attempt a takedown of the #1 Tigers as both the #2 and #3 teams dropped their own bowl games, but in a hard fought game that showed a near match of squads statistically, Clemson simply outplayed the Cornhuskers and took advantage of Nebraska mistakes to hold on to their 7-point lead for the final nine minutes to keep their claim on the #1 ranking, departing Miami with the 1981 national title.

Rankings

Awards

NFL and pro players
The following Nebraska players who participated in the 1981 season later moved on to the next level and joined a professional or semi-pro team as draftees or free agents.

References

Nebraska
Nebraska Cornhuskers football seasons
Big Eight Conference football champion seasons
Nebraska Cornhuskers football